Giovanni Castellucci (born 23 July 1959, in Senigallia) is an Italian company director. He is the former chief executive officer of Atlantia SpA.

Biography
Giovanni Castellucci was born in Senigallia (Ancona, Italy) in 1959 and graduated in mechanical engineering from the University of Florence. He completed a Master of Business Administration at the School of Management of the Bocconi University in Milan. From 1988 to 1999, he worked for Boston Consulting Group (BCG), at their offices in Paris and Milan, becoming partner and head of Italian customer service and pharma practices. In January 2000 he became chief executive officer of the Barilla Group. In June 2001 he entered the Autostrade Group as general manager. In April 2005 he took on the post of chief executive officer of IT: Autostrade per l'Italia. Following the transformation of the Autostrade Group into Atlantia, Castellucci also assumed the role of chief executive officer of the new holding. In November 2013 he is also a board director of Aeroporti di Roma.

Career

Boston Consulting Group
His first major professional experience began at Boston Consulting Group, where he worked between 1988 and 1999 as a consultant, case leader and manager at the Paris and Milan offices. In 1994, aged 34, he became partner of the group and head of Italian consumer services and pharma practices.

Barilla
In 2000 he became chief executive officer of the Barilla Group. Under his management, Barilla saw an increase in revenue of 9% (€4,400 billion in revenue), with a penetration into the US market of 12%. After that the company became the main pasta manufacturer in the United States.

Autostrade
In June 2001, he entered the Autostrade Group as general manager. From April 2005 to January 2019, he also served as chief executive officer of Autostrade per l'Italia. Currently, Autostrade per l'Italia is one of the biggest operators of toll motorways and mobility services in the world. After the tragedy in July 2013 on the Bari-Napoli highway, 40 people died when a bus without an MOT and faulty brakes fell from a viaduct, bursting through the protective guard rails, he was charged with the accusation of multiple negligent homicide and criminal negligence causing a large-scale accident. The prosecution demanded ten years. On the 11th of January 2019 he was absolved by the Court of Avellino. On the 14th of August 2018, following the collapse of the Morandi Bridge in Genoa, Castellucci received a notice of interest, alongside around 20 other employees of Autostrade per l'Italia under investigation, from the Ministry of Infrastructures and Transport and the Public Works Authority of Liguria. In an interview, after the bridge collapse he declared "I didn't know that the bridge was dangerous and that it should have been closed"

Atlantia and the Abertis Operation
In April 2006 Castellucci also assumed the post of chief executive officer of the Autostrade Group, which then became Atlantia. Over the next ten years, the group became one of the main players at international level for infrastructure, rivalling Vinci and Abertis. In addition to 3000 kilometres of highway network in Italy, today Atlantia manages over 2,000 km of toll highways in Brazil, Chile, India and Poland. Aeroporti di Roma is also part of the Atlantia Group, and manages the international hub of Rome Fiumicino and city airport Rome Ciampino, as well as the French Riviera airports (Nice, Cannes – Mandelieu and Saint Tropez). In March 2018, the Atlantia Group also entered the Eurotunnel capital with a quota of 15.49%. From 2012 to the present day, under the guidance of Atlantia, the Leonardo da Vinci–Fiumicino Airport has constantly improved the quality of its services, becoming the most appreciated hub by passengers in Europe and the Americas according to official findings of Airports Council International. The most recent operation managed by Castellucci was the acquisition of the Spanish infrastructure giant Abertis, now consolidated in Atlantia's balance sheet, following an agreement with ACS and Hochtief. On September 17th 2019 Giovanni Castellucci resigned from his position as chief executive officer and general manager of Atlantia.

Private life and background
Castellucci is married and has two children. He was a member of Italy's national youth sailing team. Aged 18, alongside two friends he founded a sail loft in Senigallia, the Challenger Sails. It is still active on the international market today. He is chairman of the Fondazione Pio Sodalizio dei Piceni, which is based in Rome.

Awards
In 2016 he was honoured with the Legion of Honour from the French Government. In 2009 the Alumni Master SDA Bocconi association awarded him the Master of Masters recognition.

Austrian honours

  Decoration of Honour for Services to the Republic of Austria for having completed the tolling project of the country's entire motorway network, in line with the Austrian government's expectations. (2004)

See also 
Autostrade of Italy
Aeroporti di Roma

References

External links
 

Italian corporate directors
Italian chairpersons of corporations
1959 births
Living people
People_from_Senigallia
Italian_businesspeople